In Greek mythology, Mestor (Ancient Greek: Μήστωρ means "adviser" or "counsellor") was the name of four men.

 Mestor, a Mycenaean prince. He was the son of Perseus and Andromeda and thus, brother of Perses, Alcaeus, Heleus, Sthenelus, Electryon, Cynurus, Gorgophone and Autochthe. By Lysidice, daughter of Hippodamia and Pelops, Mestor became the father of Hippothoe, who mothered Taphius by the god Ποτειδαϝον - Poseidon.
Mestor, a son of king Pterelaus, thus a great-great-grandson of the above.
Mestor, a son of King Priam. Apart from a single mention in the Iliad, where he is praised by his father, he appears in the Bibliotheca and Hyginus. He was taken captive by Neoptolemus, who later dressed up in Mestor's Phrygian clothes to deceive Acastus.
 In Plato's Critias, Mestor was the second of the fourth set of twins borne of Poseidon and the mortal, Cleito, and one of the first princes of Atlantis. His older twin brother was Elasippus, and his other siblings were Atlas and Eumelus, Ampheres and Evaemon, Mneseus and Autochthon, and lastly, Azaes and Diaprepes. Mestor, along with his nine siblings, became the heads of ten royal houses, each ruling a tenth portion of the island, according to a partition made by Poseidon himself, but all subject to the supreme dynasty of Atlas who was the eldest of the ten.

Notes

References 

 Dictys Cretensis, from The Trojan War. The Chronicles of Dictys of Crete and Dares the Phrygian translated by Richard McIlwaine Frazer, Jr. (1931-). Indiana University Press. 1966. Online version at the Topos Text Project.
 Gaius Julius Hyginus, Fabulae from The Myths of Hyginus translated and edited by Mary Grant. University of Kansas Publications in Humanistic Studies. Online version at the Topos Text Project.
 Homer, The Iliad with an English Translation by A.T. Murray, Ph.D. in two volumes. Cambridge, MA., Harvard University Press; London, William Heinemann, Ltd. 1924. Online version at the Perseus Digital xLibrary.
 Homer, Homeri Opera in five volumes. Oxford, Oxford University Press. 1920. Greek text available at the Perseus Digital Library.
 Pseudo-Apollodorus, The Library with an English Translation by Sir James George Frazer, F.B.A., F.R.S. in 2 Volumes, Cambridge, MA, Harvard University Press; London, William Heinemann Ltd. 1921. Online version at the Perseus Digital Library. Greek text available from the same website.

Trojans
Children of Priam
Children of Poseidon
Atlanteans
Princes in Greek mythology

Atlantis